The Pine Line Trail is a rail-trail in Taylor County, and Price County, Wisconsin.

History 
From 1876 to 1988, the site of the trail was a rail line used by the Wisconsin Central Railroad to ship eastern white pine, among other commodities. Pine still lines the trail, accounting for the trail's name.

Description
The trail's southern terminus is at Medford, Wisconsin in Taylor County, with the trailhead south of Prentice, Wisconsin in Price County.

The Pine Line is open for non-motorized use such as bicycling, hiking, and jogging from April 1 through November 30. Snowmobiles and ATV's are allowed on the trail from December 1 through March 31. There are no fees for annual use.

Annual events are scheduled on the trail such as the Dairyland Marathon and Volksmarsch, which is held on the fourth Saturday of April.

See also
 Ice Age Trail
 List of hiking trails in Wisconsin
 List of rail trails
 Outdoor recreation

Notes

Hiking trails in Wisconsin
Protected areas of Price County, Wisconsin
Protected areas of Taylor County, Wisconsin
Rail trails in Wisconsin